The Dancer and the Worker (Spanish:El bailarín y el trabajador) is a 1936 Spanish comedy film directed by Luis Marquina and starring Roberto Rey, Ana María Custodio and Antoñita Colomé.

Cast
 Roberto Rey as Carlos Montero  
 Ana María Custodio as Luisa Romagosa  
 Antoñita Colomé as Pilar  
 José Isbert as Don Carmelo Romagosa  
 Irene Caba Alba as Doña Rita  
 Sad Person
as Patricio  
 Enrique Guitart as Pepe  
 Mariano Ozores as Don Pablo  
 Luchy Soto 
 Pilar Soler 
 Eva Arión  
 Rosina Mendía
 Maruja Verge 
 Mary Cruz  
 Eva de Francisco
 Trinoche Tejada
 Pedro Hurtado
 Francisco Zabala
 M. Sáez de Heredia      
 Francisco Carollo

References

Bibliography 
 Bentley, Bernard. A Companion to Spanish Cinema. Boydell & Brewer 2008.

External links 
 

1936 comedy films
Spanish comedy films
1936 films
1930s Spanish-language films
Films directed by Luis Marquina
Spanish black-and-white films